Paciencia, also known as Filipino meringue galyetas or galletas paciencia, are Filipino cookies made with beaten egg whites, flour, and calamansi. They are typically hemispherical in shape. The name means "patience" in Spanish. They are traditionally eaten during the Christmas Season.

See also
Linga cookie
Broas
Christmas cookie
 List of cookies
Monde Nissin
Roscas
Rosquillo

References 

Philippine cuisine
Cookies
Christmas food